Beta-1,4-galactosyltransferase 1 is an enzyme that in humans is encoded by the B4GALT1 gene.

This gene is one of seven beta-1,4-galactosyltransferase (beta4GalT) genes. They encode type II membrane-bound glycoproteins that appear to have exclusive specificity for the donor substrate UDP-galactose; all transfer galactose in a beta1,4 linkage to similar acceptor sugars: GlcNAc, Glc, and Xyl. Each beta4GalT has a distinct function in the biosynthesis of different glycoconjugates and saccharide structures. As type II membrane proteins, they have an N-terminal hydrophobic signal sequence that directs the protein to the Golgi apparatus and which then remains uncleaved to function as a transmembrane anchor. By sequence similarity, the beta4GalTs form four groups: beta4GalT1 and beta4GalT2, beta4GalT3 and beta4GalT4, beta4GalT5 and beta4GalT6, and beta4GalT7. This gene is unique among the beta4GalT genes because it encodes an enzyme that participates both in glycoconjugate and lactose biosynthesis. For the first activity, the enzyme adds galactose to N-acetylglucosamine residues that are either monosaccharides or the nonreducing ends of glycoprotein carbohydrate chains. The second activity is restricted to lactating mammary tissues where the enzyme forms a heterodimer with alpha-lactalbumin to catalyze UDP-galactose + D-glucose <=> UDP + lactose. The two enzymatic forms result from alternate transcription initiation sites and post-translational processing. Two transcripts, which differ only at the 5' end, with approximate lengths of 4.1 kb and 3.9 kb encode the same protein. The longer transcript encodes the type II membrane-bound, trans-Golgi resident protein involved in glycoconjugate biosynthesis. The shorter transcript encodes a protein which is cleaved to form the soluble lactose synthase.

References

Further reading

External links
  GeneReviews/NCBI/NIH/UW entry on Congenital Disorders of Glycosylation Overview